Sture Nordin (11 November 1933 – 11 October 2000) was a leading Swedish jazz bassist.

After playing with Lars Gullin's orchestra, he joined Putte Wickman's sextet in 1955 before going on to join a trio with Rune Ofverman and Egil Johansen. Admitted to the Royal Swedish Academy of Music, together with Lasse Petterson and Georg Riedel, Nordin was expelled when it was found out that he was playing jazz.

He accompanied several visiting musicians on their visits to Sweden, including Sonny Boy Williamson II (Rice Miller), Josh White, Ben Webster, Dexter Gordon, Clark Terry, Johnny Griffin, Benny Bailey, Gábor Szabó and Dick Morrissey, as well as playing regularly with other leading Swedish jazz musicians, such as Jan Johansson, Rolf Ericson, Jan Allan, and Arne Domnérus.

Discography

As leader/co-leader
1978: African Igloo
1979: Brazilian Igloo
1979: Nordin på Bolaget

As sideman
1966: Grimascher och telegram – Cornelis Vreeswijk
1968: Tio vackra visor och Personliga Person – Cornelis Vreeswijk
1969: The Sound of Surprise – Live at the Pawnshop – Putte Wickman
1972: Small World – Gábor Szabó
1975: Don't Get Around Much Anymore – Live at Bullerbyn
1978: Cornelis sjunger Victor Jara – Cornelis Vreeswijk
1983: Glad, Koonix! - Lee Konitz

References 

1933 births
2000 deaths
Musicians from Gothenburg
Swedish jazz musicians